The Children's Place Inc. is a specialty retailer of children's apparel and accessories headquartered in Secaucus, New Jersey. It also markets apparel under the Children's Place, Place, Baby Place, and Gymboree brand names.

As of October 31, 2015, it operated 955 stores in the United States, Canada and Puerto Rico, an online store at www.childrensplace.com, and had 90 international stores operated by its franchise partners in 12 countries.

History

The company was founded in 1969. It was acquired by Federated Department Stores in 1981. After Campeau Corporation acquired Federated, they sold The Children's Place to a group led by Joseph Sitt in 1988. They became publicly traded on the NASDAQ exchange in 1997 under the ticker symbol PLCE.

Between 2004 and 2007, the company owned and operated 335 Disney Stores through a subsidiary Hoop Holdings/Hoop Retail Stores LLC. Disney sold the chain for the cost of inventory to Children's Place subsidiary Hoop Holdings plus a 15-year licensing agreement. Mario Ciampi, senior vice president of store development and logistics, was named Hoop/Disney Store North America president. The company agreed to pump $100 million in operation upgrades and remodeling. Under the licensing agreement, a "royalty holiday" period existed until October 2006 to allow revamping of the stores. The royalty thereafter was 5% of store sales while online sales get Disney a 9% to 10% royalty. Hoop Holdings was able to write off the cost ($48 million) of the equipment and property received in the purchase.

Hoops saw progress with its strategy as open stores in 2006 for 11 month saw 15% increase in sales assisted by a better Disney box office results and the Disney Channel hit High School Musical. A store website would be up and running in April 2007.

In June 2007, the company began negotiations to sell the rights back to The Walt Disney Company. On March 26, 2008, Hoop Holdings/Hoop Retail Stores LLC and related subsidiaries of TCP that operated Disney Store retail locations filed for bankruptcy. Hoop obtained from Wells Fargo $35 million of debtor-in-possession financing and appointed Perry Mandarino of Traxi LLC, the Manhattan financial-restructuring company, as chief restructuring officer. On May 1, 2008, 231 Disney Stores in North America once again became the property of Disney, operating under the Disney Consumer Products arm.

On December 11, 2009, The Children's Place Retail Stores announced the appointment of former Lord & Taylor CEO Jane T. Elfers as president and chief executive officer (CEO) of the company, effective January 4, 2010.

In the summer of 2013, the store withdrew a T-shirt from the stores with four options for "My best subjects" including "Shopping, Music, Dance and Math." While shopping, music, and dance were checked, math was left unchecked because the T-shirt stated "Nobody’s perfect!"

A factory in the Rana Plaza building near Dhaka, Bangladesh that produced Children's Place merchandise collapsed in April 2013, killing 1,134 people.  The company then joined Alliance for Bangladesh Worker Safety along with other North American apparel retailers, and former U.S. Senators George Mitchell and Olympia Snowe. The Alliance's mission is a five-year plan to improve conditions in Bangladeshi garment factories.

Operations

Most of The Children's Place stores are located in and around regional malls, but also include some strip shopping centers, outlets, and street stores. The majority of their stores are small, traditional mall stores, although some Children's Place outlets are in a big box format.

References

Clothing retailers of the United States
Children's clothing retailers
Companies based in Hudson County, New Jersey
American companies established in 1969
Clothing companies established in 1969
Retail companies established in 1969
Private equity portfolio companies
Companies listed on the Nasdaq
1969 establishments in New Jersey
Secaucus, New Jersey
1997 initial public offerings
Retail companies based in New Jersey